Ponguleti Srinivas Reddy is an Indian politician and a member of parliament from Khammam (Lok Sabha constituency), Telangana. He won in the 2014 Indian general election being a YSR Congress Party candidate defeating Nama Nageswara Rao with a majority of 11,974 votes. He later changed to regional political party TRS (Telangana Rashtra Samithi). In the general elections of 2018 he supported the M.L.A. candidate Lingala Kamalraju on behalf of the TRS.

References

India MPs 2014–2019
Lok Sabha members from Telangana
Living people
People from Khammam
YSR Congress Party politicians
1965 births
Telangana Rashtra Samithi politicians